The Humane Slaughter Association (HSA) supports research, training, and development to improve the welfare of livestock during transport and slaughter. It provides technical information about handling and slaughter on its website, training for farmer staff and vets, advice to governments and industry, and funding of science and technology to make slaughter more humane. HSA is the sister charity to Universities Federation for Animal Welfare.

History

The Council of Justice to Animals (CJA) was founded at a meeting held on 17, January 1911 to improve humane methods for the slaughter of livestock and address the killing of unwanted pets. The Duchess of Portland was elected President, physician Charles Reinhardt was Chairman and novelist Thomas Hardy was a member of the committee. In 1928, CJA merged with the Humane Slaughter of Animals Association to become the Council of Justice for Animals and the Humane Slaughter Association, which is most often called "the HSA.". On 1 April 2016 the Humane Slaughter Association became a charitable incorporated organization and the Council of Justice for Animals was dropped from the name.

In the early 1920s, HSA introduced and demonstrated a mechanical stunner, which led to the adoption of humane stunning "by 28 London boroughs and later by 494 other local authorities." HSA helped improve water, shelter, and handling conditions at animal markets. It lobbied for transporting cattle by train instead of on foot, and in 1941, rail lines were built to a major slaughterhouse for this reason.

HSA played a key role in passage of
 UK's Slaughter of Animals Act 1933, requiring mechanical stunning of cows and electrical stunning of pigs (The law excluded pig facilities without electricity, sheep, and Jewish/Muslim meat.)
 UK's Slaughter of Animals (Pigs) Act 1954, which required mechanical stunning of pigs outside slaughterhouses
 Canada's 1960 humane-slaughter regulations, partially inspired by HSA's captive-bolt demonstrations in 1950
 UK's ban on live exports for slaughter in the early 1970s (reversed in 1975).
HSA was asked for its views on the UK Slaughterhouses Act 1958 and the Prevention of Cruelty and Hygiene Regulations. HSA was mentioned in the House of Lords debates over UK's Slaughter of Poultry Act 1967.

Research support

Humane Slaughter Award

HSA aims to encourage research and development of more humane livestock-slaughter methods with its Humane Slaughter Award, which recognizes "individuals or organisations, based anywhere in the world, whose work has resulted in significant advances in the humane slaughter of farmed livestock."

Scholarships

HSA has given a total of 48 Dorothy Sidley Scholarships of £2,000 each "to enable students or trainees in the industry to carry out a project which is clearly aimed at improving the welfare of food animals in markets, during transport or at slaughter." Research supported has included the welfare of sheep while transported at sea, handling methods for poultry, rejection of carcases in religious slaughter, and captive-bolt stunning of alpacas.

In 2011, HSA gave a Research Training Scholarship for PhD research to Jessica Hopkins of the Scottish Agricultural College for exploration of humane mechanical methods to kill sick or injured chickens in emergency situations on farms, as an improvement over cervical dislocation, which is thought to not be completely humane. The research has been presented at several conferences.

Grants

HSA offers grants "for essential research and other projects aimed at improving animal welfare during transport, in markets and at slaughter." Past grants have addressed livestock transport vehicle emergencies, monitoring atmosphere stunning of poultry, and electrical stunning on sea bass.

Conferences

A 2004 HSA workshop in Lochearnhead, Scotland demonstrated an electric stunner for farmed trout. Electric stunning of farmed fish has since been widely adopted at least in the UK.

In 2011, to celebrate its centennial year, HSA organized the symposium "Recent Advances in the Welfare of Livestock at Slaughter", which was attended by 250 people from around the world. The event featured over a dozen presentations, including one by Temple Grandin.

In 2013, HSA convened a workshop on Low Atmospheric Pressure Stunning (LAPS), a proposal to kill chickens by withdrawing air from a chamber over the course of 5 minutes. The lack of oxygen induces unconsciousness without a rise in heart rate and with brain activity that resembles a sleep-like state before death.

Training and advice

HSA offers training courses to farmers (large-scale, small-scale, and hobbyist), slaughter workers, and students. For example, here is a subset of the trainings HSA conducted during 2009-2010:
 teaching a major UK duck farmer and processor about humane on-farm killing of sick and injured birds
 training a poultry processor in Thailand, a UK turkey processor, two retail sites for red-meat processing, and a pig processor
 training a salmon producer in Norway and rainbow-trout farmers in central Scotland
 five smallholder poultry-welfare courses and six courses on captive-bolt stunning for pigs.
HSA educational materials have won International Visual Communications Awards in 1995 and 2000 and the Meat Industry Awards Training Initiative of the Year, Poultry Welfare in 2006.

HSA also provides advice to meat producers, governments, and academics. At the request of a producer or retailer, it performs inspections of slaughterhouses and livestock markets to assess animal welfare and suggest improvements.

See also
 Animal slaughter
 Fish welfare at slaughter
 Controlled-atmosphere killing
 Temple Grandin

References

1911 establishments in the United Kingdom
Animal killing
Animal charities based in the United Kingdom
Animal welfare organisations based in the United Kingdom
Organizations established in 1911